Fraternity Hall is a site on the National Register of Historic Places located in Elkhorn, Montana.  It was added to the Register on April 3, 1975.

The building was built in the 1890s.  It has an ornate, cantilevered balcony and it has a false front with simulated pilasters and arches which "is said to be architecturally unique".  Its NRHP nomination asserts that "It is perhaps the most photographed ghost town building in the United States and is featured on the cover of many publications on ghost towns. The Architectural Record also featured Fraternity Hall as number one on a list of 12 structures in the West that should be saved.  The first floor of the building was used as a meeting hall, community dance hall, and for theatrical presentations. The second floor served as a lodge meeting hall for such groups as the Masons, Knights of Pythias, IOOF, IOGT, Sons of St. Georges, and the Ancient Order of United Workmen."

References

Clubhouses on the National Register of Historic Places in Montana
National Register of Historic Places in Jefferson County, Montana
Greek Revival architecture in Montana
Buildings and structures completed in 1893
1893 establishments in Montana